Bani Mansour (Sanaa) is a sub-district located in the Al Haymah Al Kharijiyah District, Sana'a Governorate, Yemen. Bani Mansour (Sanaa) had a population of 2584 according to the 2004 census.

References 

Sub-districts in Al Haymah Al Kharijiyah District